Nick Richmond (born May 1, 1987 in Garland, Texas) is a former American football offensive tackle. He attended Texas Christian, as a member of the 2010 graduating class. Shortly after the draft ended, Richmond joined the San Diego Chargers as an undrafted free agent.

References

External links
San Diego Chargers profile
Scout profile

1987 births
Living people
American football offensive tackles
San Diego Chargers players
TCU Horned Frogs football players
People from Garland, Texas